The Italian team, that had been absent in 1936, returned for the 1937 Tour de France, after Benito Mussolini removed their boycott of the Tour, and selected new star Gino Bartali, who had won the 1936 and 1937 Giro d'Italia, as the Italian team leader. The Italian team had 10 cyclists, just as the Belgian, German and French teams. There were also small teams of six cyclists: the Spanish, Dutch, Luxembourgian and Swiss teams. The last national team was the Great Britain-Canada team, consisting of two British cyclists and one Canadian.

The French team included Roger Lapébie. Lapébie had had a difficult relation with Desgrange. This had caused Lapébie to be out of the national team in 1935, and completely absent from the Tour in 1936. In 1937, Desgrange had retired, and Lapébie was back. In the month before the Tour started, Lapébie had undergone surgery for a lumbar hernia, and there were doubts about his form.

There were also 31 cyclists riding as individuals. These individuals were responsible for their own food and accommodation.

By team

By rider

By nationality

References

1937 Tour de France
1937